John Perin (born 10 June 1948) is an Australian former football (soccer) player and coach. Perin played five times for Australia.

Perin is a member of the Australian Football Hall of Fame.

References

1948 births
Living people
Australian soccer players
Australia international soccer players
Association football midfielders